Lakemont is a hamlet in the town of Starkey, Yates County, New York, United States.  It is part of the Finger Lakes region. Lakemont is located several miles north of Glenora. Patrick "Kettle" Johnson is buried in a cemetery near Lakemont. His burial location is not specified.  The ZIP Code for Lakemont is 14857.

The American writer and composer Paul Bowles is buried there.

References

Hamlets in New York (state)
Hamlets in Yates County, New York